Isdalen Valley is an ice-filled valley between Aurdalsegga Ridge and Isdalsegga Ridge in the Südliche Petermann Range of the Wohlthat Mountains in Antarctica. It was discovered and plotted from air photos by the Third German Antarctic Expedition in 1938–39. It was replotted from air photos and surveys by the Sixth Norwegian Antarctic Expedition in 1956–60 and named "Isdalen" (the ice valley).

References

Princess Astrid Coast
Valleys of Queen Maud Land